Aratashen (also Romanized as Arratashen; also, Artashen; until 1978 Zeyva Hayi – meaning "Armenian Zeyva", Zeyva, Bol’shaya Zeyva and Nerkin-Zeyva) is a town in the Armavir Province of Armenia. It is located on the Ararat plain.

Archaeology
A neolithic-chalcolithic tell is located south of the town.

The first occupation phase at Aratashen was preceramic, going back to 6500 BCE. Parallels are found in the southeastern Trans-Caucasia, and in the northeastern Mesopotamia, especially based on the construction techniques and the lithic and bone tools.

Also the pottery, after it appears, is somewhat similar. The best parallels are with Kul Tepe of Nakhichevan to the south, and with the northern Near East, such as the lower levels of Hajji Firuz Tepe, at Dalma Tepe, and at Tilki Tepe.

The Shulaveri-Shomutepe culture, that developed in the neighbouring Kura basin and the Karabakh steppe, does not have close parallels with the early Aratashen artifacts.

First pottery appears at the end of the fifth millennium BC. At this time, the plain of Ararat was in contact with the contemporary populations of northern Mesopotamia, and also with those of the ‘Sioni culture’ of the Kura basin.

The later period pottery of Aratashen is becoming close to that of the Sioni culture, which locally succeeded the
Shulaveri-Shomutepe culture. Here we already see the features of the later Kura-Araxes culture pottery.

Metalwork
There's evidence of very early metallurgy at Aratashen, going back to the first half of the sixth millennium BCE. According to A. Courcier,

In the Neolithic level IId of Aratashen, dated to the beginnings of the sixth millennium BCE, several fragments of copper ores (malachite and azurite) and 57 arsenical copper beads were discovered. Close to Aratashen, at Khatunark, one fragment of copper ore (malachite) has been discovered in a level dated to the first half of the sixth millennium BCE. This artefact, together with those found at Aratashen, suggest the nascent emergence of metallurgy in the Ararat region already during the Late Neolithic.

At Aratashen and Khatunakh/Aknashen, there are similarities to the contemporary sites of Kultepe I, and Alikemek-Tepesi.

See also 
Armavir Province

References

External links

World Gazeteer: Armenia – World-Gazetteer.com

Populated places in Armavir Province
Kura-Araxes culture
Archaeometallurgy
Yazidi populated places in Armenia